William Bradfield may refer to:

 William Bradfield (died 1998), convicted of conspiracy to commit murder, see Jay C. Smith
 William A. Bradfield (1927–2014), Australian comet hunter